Battle of Athens may refer to:

In Greece
 Noemvriana ("November Events"), also known as the "Greek Vespers", an armed clash between French sailors and Greek troops at Athens in 1916 
 Battle of Athens (1941), a World War II air battle, part of the Battle of Greece in 1941
 Dekemvriana ("December Events"), armed clashes between communists and government/British forces in 1944

In the United States
 Battle of Athens (1861), American Civil War battle in northeast Missouri in 1861
 Battle of Athens (1864), American Civil War battle in northern Alabama 1864
 Battle of Sulphur Creek Trestle, also called the Battle of Athens, American Civil War battle in northern Alabama in 1864
 Battle of Athens (1946), also called the "McMinn County War," a rebellion against the local government in Athens and Etowah, Tennessee, in 1946